Blue Streak is a wooden roller coaster located at Cedar Point in Sandusky, Ohio. Built by Philadelphia Toboggan Company, Blue Streak opened to the public on May 23, 1964, and is the park's oldest operating roller coaster. In 2013, it achieved its highest ranking of 27th among the world's top wooden roller coasters in the annual Golden Ticket Awards publication by Amusement Today.

History

Following the removal of Cyclone in 1951, more than a decade passed before Cedar Point decided to add another major roller coaster to its list of attractions. Several smaller coasters were added during this time, but only two remained by 1963. For the 1964 season, Philadelphia Toboggan Company was hired to build a new roller coaster under the direction of Frank F. Hoover and John C. Allen. Blue Streak opened to the public on May 23, 1964. It was one of only three roller coasters operating at the time within the park. The attraction's success led to a rebirth of roller coasters at Cedar Point, including the installation of Cedar Creek Mine Ride (1969), Corkscrew (1976), Gemini (1978) and Wilderness Run (1979).

Blue Streak features a traditional "out-and-back" layout design. The roller coaster was named after the local Sandusky High School athletic nickname "The Blue Streaks". Cedar Point invested  to construct the wooden roller coaster, and it remains a favorite at the park, consistently getting 30 minute to hour waits, and within annual roller coaster polls. In Amusement Today's 2013 Golden Ticket Awards, Blue Streak was ranked 27th among wooden roller coasters worldwide – its highest ranking to date.

On July 20, 2022, during Coaster Con 44, American Coaster Enthusiasts designated Blue Steak a Coaster Landmark.

Ride experience
Riders then enter a series of two short hills which provide the ride's maximum airtime followed by a larger, third hill that slows the train slightly. After the next drop, the train climbs into a 180-degree turn that sends riders over a short hill followed by three medium-sized hills on its way back. The ride ends on the track's final brake run before returning to the station.

Rankings

References

External links

 Cedarpoint.com – Official Blue Streak page
 Official POV of Blue Streak
 Blue Streak Photo Gallery at The Point Online

Cedar Point
Roller coasters introduced in 1964
Roller coasters operated by Cedar Fair
Roller coasters in Ohio